John Walmsley (born 1947)  is a freelance British documentary photographer and educationalist. His work is featured in the National Portrait Gallery in London, the Tate Britain Library, the National Art Library at the V&A, the V&A Museum of Childhood, Museum of Liverpool and la Bibliothèque nationale in Paris. He is a member of The Society of Authors, the National Union of Journalists and The Royal Photographic Society. His work has been published in over a thousand books worldwide. He is the author of the Penguin Education Special, Neill & Summerhill: A Man and His Work (1969) with a text by Leila Berg.

Education

1965–1968 Art School
In his final year studying photography at Guildford School of Art, the students asked to talk with the governors about the quality of the courses. The governors refused, and so began the longest ever sit-in at an educational institution in the UK. Walmsley took part in and photographed the sit-in from the inside, start to finish.
Instead of submitting assigned course work as his final submission, Walmsley presented the photos of the sit-in thinking that, recognising and reacting to unfolding national events, was an appropriate display of his skill as a photographer, something which his degree trained him to do. However, the Art School staff saw it differently and failed him, which left Walmsley with no qualifications. The governors never did talk seriously with the students about their differences, but, as soon as the sit-in ended, the Minister for Education in the UK government announced that, from then on, all schools, colleges and Universities must invite students and staff on to their Advisory Boards.

1967 A.S. Neill and Summerhill School
Walmsley, still a student, had permission to photograph at A.S. Neill's democratic school Summerhill, a place where he immediately felt at home. The photos were published in 1969 with a text by Leila Berg as Neill & Summerhill: A Man and His Work, a Penguin Education Special. Berg and Walmsley worked together on numerous books for the next 35 years.  Walmsley says, "These were either about how society treats children or were early readers, stories of everyday life, for kids to cuddle up with mum or dad". During Walmsley's final year at art school, he began supplying photos to educational textbook publishers, something he continued to do for decades afterwards.

Early career
Walmsley worked on commissions for magazines, book publishers, government departments and charities but always retained his copyright.  He also shot many personal projects including one on repertory theatre. In 1973 he followed the Salisbury Playhouse production of ‘Mother Courage’, living and working with the company from first read-through to first-night, including learning lines in their ‘Digs’, finding and preparing the props, all the different rehearsals and time off for shopping, laundrette, boating on the river and more.  Walmsley believes this record of theatre life is unique in its breadth and depth and is now a historical document.

A self-published book with a text by Jenny Ellis, who played Mother Courage in the photos, is planned for late 2021. The book will have contributions from many actors who readily acknowledge they would not be where they are today had it not been for their training in rep’ (Dame Maggie Smith, Dame Judi Dench, Sir Ian McKellen and Timothy West).

With grants from several arts bodies, Walmsley has worked with groups of school children in their last week before the summer break to photograph any subject the children chose. One school Walmsley taught as was located in horse racing country and these school children wanted to photograph the stables and, most particularly, the early morning gallops.

Liverpool Free School
Liverpool Free School, also known as the Scotland Road or Scottie Road Free School, was founded and run as an alternative to normal school by two teachers, John Ord and Bill Murphy. This new school had no headmaster nor any form of hierarchy and did not recognise any central authority. It was controlled by parents, the kids and teachers, together. The school was registered with the Department for Education and was classed as "Education Otherwise", same as home schoolers, and was still subject to regular inspections. The students begged and borrowed an old building, desks, books, and an old ambulance for trips. The photos were exhibited at the Bluecoat in Liverpool in 2017 and Walmsley arranged for John Ord and the ‘kids’ to come to the opening night, the first time they’d met in decades.

Digswell Arts Trust
Walmsley was a Fellow at Digswell House, a large country house in Digswell, Hertfordshire from 1972 to 1976. Digswell Arts provided living and working space to a wide variety of practicing artists: potters (including Elizabeth Fritsch), painters, dancers, woodcarvers, film-makers, jazz musicians (including saxophonist Lol Coxhill), stained glass workers and more. Walmsley was the resident photographer and built a public darkroom to run photography classes for the locals.  He also photographed the resident artists at work.

1974–1981 Architectural Association
Walmsley was a part-time lecturer at the Architectural Association School of Architecture in London. This was a particularly creative period at the AA with many inspirational students, including architect Zaha Hadid and staff. He noticed that most architectural photos excluded people. He believed that, while there was certainly a place for such photographs, a building is mainly for and about people, so he encouraged the students to shoot both with and without people. The photos of life at the AA in 1975 here can be found online.

Wester Hailes, Edinburgh
In 1979 Walmsley received a grant from the Scottish Arts Council to live on the new Wester Hailes estate and be an Artist in Residence at the Wester Hailes Education Centre He worked with the students at the education centre, as well as photographing every day life in the neighbourhood. These photographs were made into a booklet and an exhibition at the time. A self-published book is planned for late 2021 to coincide with an exhibition (link to follow) at the Whale Arts Gallery in Wester Hailes. All the photos will be in the archive at the School of Scottish Studies, University of Edinburgh for use by students and researchers (link to follow).

1980s–2010s
Since leaving art school, Walmsley has supplied photos to all the big textbook publishers, mostly in the UK and Europe, with work published in 1,000+ books worldwide. He continues to shoot subjects that interest him including the Brexit demonstrations and the "Summer Eights" rowing festival at Oxford University, the LGBT+ Pride Festival in Oxford and special needs provision in schools.

2018  ‘Finding our Voice’ exhibition and catalogue
To mark the 50th anniversary of the Guildford School of Art sit-in, there was an exhibition at Guildford House Gallery. Walmsley co-curated it and co-edited the catalogue ‘Finding Our Voice’ with Brian Dunce, one of the staff members who were sacked during the sit-in.

Armenian earthquake
Because of his involvement with both education and architecture, the British government sent Walmsley to Armenia, in 1990 following the massive earthquake two years earlier. He documented the rebuilding of the Lord Byron School, a public school in  Gyumri, Armenia one of many destroyed by the earthquake. Because it worked in the English language, when the Soviet general secretary Mikhail Gorbachev asked for international assistance, the British government responded by having British architects design a new building which was built and equipped by British companies.

Artists should be paid, too
For the sake of artists’ incomes and their very survival, Walmsley is a staunch supporter of copyright law. Most artists (painters, musicians, photographers and writers) existed on low incomes.  The internet has made it very easy for anyone to view images, copy them and use them how they like, without asking permission or paying the artists. This has destroyed the small income artists used to have. Copyright law states that using an image without permission from the copyright owner is unlawful.  Walmsley and others speak up for artists to be paid for their work, like everyone else.  A group of photographers on Editorial Photographers UK (EPUK), including Walmsley, has been fighting this trend for the last ten years with some success.  Walmsley, himself, has settled over 150 cases with four going to court hearings.  Put simply, he believes that artists should be paid, too.

Publications
 Neill Summerhill: A Man and His Work,  Penguin Education Special, 1969
 Presents, author Leila Berg, Snaps series, Macmillan Education, 1977
 Looking For Elephants, author Leila Berg, Snaps series, Macmillan Education, 1977
 Birthday Races, author Leila Berg, Snaps series, Macmillan Education, 1977
 Waiting for the Dark, author Leila Berg, Snaps series, Macmillan Education, 1977
 A Tickle, author Leila Berg, Chatterbooks series, Methuen, 1981
 The Hot, Hot Day, author Leila Berg, Chatterbooks series, Methuen, 1981
 Our Walk, author Leila Berg, Chatterbooks series, Methuen, 1981
 In A House I Know, author Leila Berg, Chatterbooks series, Methuen, 1981
 Finding our Voice, exhibition catalogue, co-edited with Brian Dunce (self-published)

Café Royal Books publications

 Summerhill
 AA School of Architecture
 Wester Hailes
 Anna Scher Children's Theatre
 Sit-in at Guildford School of Art
 The Grosvenor Square protest

Exhibitions
 1970  The new Charing Cross Hospital, London.
Many people in hospitals have time on their hands.  A small exhibition helps take their minds off their worries.
 1971  Foto Galerie die Brücke, Vienna  
Summerhill work.
 1975  Impressions Gallery, York
Photojournalism in the theatre
 National Portrait Gallery
Two joint exhibitions
 2016  Guildford Museum  
Early B&W work. 
 2018  The Bluecoat, Liverpool:  
Scottie Road Free School photos.

Upcoming 
 2021–23  Magistrates’ Association
A joint exhibition to celebrate the first 100 years of the Magistrates’ Association encompassing all the varied areas they work in

Collections
Walmsley's work can be found in the collections of the following institutions:

 National Portrait Gallery
 Tate Britain Library
 National Art Library at the V&A
 V&A Museum of Childhood
 Liverpool Museum
 La Bibliothèque nationale de France
 Library, University of California, San Diego

His work is soon to be part of the archive of the University of Edinburgh.

Talks
As an educationalist and experienced journalistic/documentary photographer, Walmsley has given several talks over the past year.

 2014 National Union of Journalists, (A talk on tackling copyright infringement for professional photographers.)
 2018 Walker Art Gallery, Liverpool as part of the ‘Time Tunnel Festival’. (A talk to Liverpool John Moores University’s Fine Art students on protest and sticking up for yourself in the current business climate.)
 2019 National Photography Symposium (at University of Salford for Redeye.)
 2021 Royal Photographic Society (A talk by John Walmsley about his work as a freelance documentary photographer.)
 2021 Scheduled: ‘Getting Your Ducks in a Row’ (A talk to both young and experienced artists of all kinds about Getting your ducks in a row and how to be business-like. The talk aims to educate artists about what to do it their work is used without permission and how they can be in good shape to pursue payment if necessary. Walmsley believes this isn't really taught to a useful degree at College or University.)

External links 
 John Walmsley Website
 Wester Hailes by John Walmsley at Document Scotland
 John Walmsley at 100 Years of Summerhill

References 

1947 births
Living people
20th-century British photographers
21st-century British photographers
British photojournalists
British portrait photographers
Portrait photographers